Voyage data recorder, or VDR, is a data recording system designed for all vessels required to comply with the IMO's International Convention SOLAS Requirements (IMO Res.A.861(20)) in order to collect data from various sensors on board the vessel. It then digitizes, compresses and stores this information in an externally mounted protective storage unit. The protective storage unit is a tamper-proof unit designed to withstand the extreme shock, impact, pressure and heat, which could be associated with a marine incident (fire, explosion, collision, sinking, etc.).

Passenger ships and ships other than passenger ships of 3000 gross tonnage and upwards constructed on or after 1 July 2002 must carry voyage data recorders (VDRs) to assist in accident investigations, under regulations adopted in 2000, which entered into force on 1 July 2002.

The protective storage unit may be in a retrievable fixed unit or free float unit (or combined with EPIRB) when the ship sinks in a marine accident. The last 12 hours (48 Hours for the 2014 regulations MSC.333(90)) of stored data in the protected unit can be recovered and replayed by the authorities or ship owners for incident investigation. Besides the protective storage unit, the VDR system may consist of a recording control unit and a data acquisition unit, which are connected to various equipment and sensors on board a ship.  The new MSC.333(90) regulations also state a minimum of 30 days of recorded data must be held internally (this could be within the recording control unit, data acquisition unit, Main Electronics Unit depending on the manufacturers terminology).

Although the primary purpose of the VDR is for accident investigation after the fact, there can be other uses of recorded data for preventive maintenance, performance efficiency monitoring, heavy weather damage analysis, accident avoidance and training purposes to improve safety and reduce running costs.

Simplified voyage data recorder (S-VDR), as defined by the requirements of IMO Performance Standard MSC.163(78), is a lower cost simplified version VDR for small ships with only basic ship's data recorded.

Voyage data
The information recorded in the unit(s) (sometimes also called the ship's black box) may include the following information:

 Position, date, time using GPS
 Speed log – Speed through water or speed over ground
 Gyro compass – Heading
 Radar* – As displayed or AIS data if no off-the-shelf converter available for the Radar video
 ECDIS* – A screen capture every 15 seconds and a list of navigational charts in use every 10 minutes or when a chart change occurs
 Audio from the bridge, including bridge wings
 VHF radio communications
 Echo sounder* – Depth under keel
 Main alarms* – All IMO mandatory alarms
 Hull openings* – Status of hull doors as indicated on the bridge
 Watertight & fire doors* status as indicated on the bridge
 Hull stress* – Accelerations and hull stresses
 Rudder* – Order and feedback response
 Engine/Propeller* – Order and feedback response
 Thrusters* – Status, direction, amount of thrust % or RPM
 Anemometer and weather vane* – Wind speed and direction

Data marked with * may not be recorded in S-VDR, except Radar and Echo Sounder if data and standard interfaces available.

See also

Event data recorder
Emergency position-indicating radiobeacon station (EPIRB)
Emergency locator beacon
Flight recorder

References

External links
 IMO Voyage data recorders

Navigational equipment
Recording devices